Advanced International Model Higher Secondary School is a school in Nepal located near the busy market of Lagankhel, Batukbhairab Marg Lalitpur. In 2016, the school celebrated the 30th anniversary of the establishment. The school has its own AIMS International College giving Bachelor level education . The institute will transition to its newly built premises approximately two minutes north of the current site by 2021.

Academic environment 
The Montessori program offered by the authorities claim to offer an age-specific and age-appropriate learning environment that resembles a home-like setting.

Primary and Secondary Education at AIMS 
The instruction for grades 1 - 10 are based on the curriculum mandated by the Ministry of Education (Nepal).

They use multiple textbooks published by the government of Nepal, national and international private publishers. More than 90% of instructions are claimed to be delivered in  English language. .

Extra curricular activities such as Games, Labs, etc are offered.

References

Schools in Nepal
Lalitpur District, Nepal